How to Train Your Dragon 2 is a 2014 American computer-animated action fantasy film loosely based on the book series of the same name by Cressida Cowell. Produced by DreamWorks Animation and distributed by 20th Century Fox, it is the sequel to the 2010 film How to Train Your Dragon and the second installment in the trilogy. The film was written and directed by Dean DeBlois, and stars the returning voices of Jay Baruchel, Gerard Butler, Craig Ferguson, America Ferrera, Jonah Hill, Christopher Mintz-Plasse, T.J. Miller, and Kristen Wiig, along with Cate Blanchett, Djimon Hounsou, and Kit Harington joining the cast. 

Set five years after the events of the first film, the film follows twenty-year-old Hiccup and his friends as young adults as they encounter Valka, Hiccup's long-lost mother, and Drago Bludvist, a madman who wants to conquer the world.

The sequel to How to Train Your Dragon was announced in April 2010. DeBlois, who co-directed the first film, began drafting the outline in February 2010. He had agreed to return to direct the second film on the condition that he would be allowed to turn it into a trilogy. He cited The Empire Strikes Back and My Neighbor Totoro as his main inspirations, with the expanded scope of The Empire Strikes Back being particularly influential. DeBlois and his creative team visited Norway and Svalbard to look for inspirations for the setting. Composer John Powell returned to score the film. The entire voice cast from the first film also returned, while Blanchett and Hounsou signed on to voice Valka and Drago, respectively. How to Train Your Dragon 2 was DreamWorks' first film to use scalable multi-core processing and the studio's new animation and lighting software.

The film premiered at the 2014 Cannes Film Festival on May 16, 2014, and was released in the United States on June 13. It received positive reviews for its animation, voice acting, musical score, action sequences, emotional depth, and darker, more serious tone compared to its predecessor. It grossed over $621 million worldwide, making it the 12th-highest-grossing film of 2014. It earned less than its predecessor at the US box office, but performed better internationally. How to Train Your Dragon 2 won the Golden Globe Award for Best Animated Feature Film and six Annie Awards, including Best Animated Feature, and was nominated for the Academy Award for Best Animated Feature. The final installment in the trilogy, How to Train Your Dragon: The Hidden World, was released on February 22, 2019.

Plot 
Five years after the Viking villagers of Berk and the dragons made peace, they live together in harmony. Hiccup and his dragon, Toothless the Night Fury, discover and map unexplored lands. Now 20 years old, he is being pressed by his father, Stoick the Vast, to succeed him as chieftain, although Hiccup feels unsure he is ready.

While investigating a burnt forest, Hiccup and Astrid discover the remains of a fort encased in ice and meet a group of dragon trappers. Their leader Eret attempts to capture their dragons for their employer, Drago Bludvist, who plots to capture and enslave all dragons into becoming his soldiers. Hiccup and Astrid escape and warn Stoick about Drago. Stoick fortifies Berk to prepare for battle. Hiccup, however, refuses to believe war is inevitable and flies off to talk to Drago. Stoick tries to stop him, explaining that he once met Drago at a gathering of chieftains, where Drago had offered them protection from dragons if they pledged to serve him; when they laughed it off as a joke, he had his dragons attack them, with Stoick the sole survivor.

Undeterred, Hiccup flies off with Toothless in search of Drago to try to reason with him. They instead meet a mysterious dragon rider, who is revealed to be Hiccup's long-lost mother, Valka, who was assumed to have been eaten alive by a Night Fury. She explains that, like her son, she could not bring herself to kill dragons. After being carried off during a dragon raid, she spent 20 years rescuing dragons from Drago and bringing them to an island nest created out of ice by a gigantic, ice-spewing alpha dragon called a "Bewilderbeast", which is able to control smaller dragons by emitting hypnotic sound waves. Stoick and his lieutenant Gobber track Hiccup to the nest, where Stoick discovers his wife is alive. Meanwhile, Astrid and the other riders force Eret to lead them to Drago, who captures them and their dragons and, learning of Berk's dragons, sends his armada to attack the dragon nest. He also attempts to execute Eret, but Astrid's dragon, Stormfly, saves him. A grateful Eret later helps her and the others escape.

At the nest, a battle ensues between the dragon riders, Valka's dragons, and Drago's armada, during which Drago reveals his own Bewilderbeast to challenge the alpha. The two colossal dragons fight, ending with Drago's Bewilderbeast killing its rival and becoming the new alpha. Drago's Bewilderbeast seizes control of all the adult dragons. Hiccup tries to persuade Drago to end the violence, but Drago orders his Bewilderbeast to have Toothless kill him. The hypnotized Toothless fires a plasma bolt toward Hiccup, but Stoick pushes him out of the way and is killed instead. The Bewilderbeast momentarily relinquishes control of Toothless, but Hiccup drives Toothless away in a fit of despair over his father's death. Drago maroons Hiccup and the others on the island and rides Toothless, again under the control of the Bewilderbeast, to lead his army to conquer Berk. Stoick is given a Viking funeral, and Hiccup, having lost both his father and dragon, is unsure what to do. Valka encouragingly tells him he alone can unite humans and dragons. Inspired by her words and his father's, Hiccup and his allies return to Berk to stop Drago by riding the baby dragons, which are immune to the Bewilderbeast's control.

Back at Berk, they find that Drago has attacked the village and taken control of its dragons. With a heartfelt apology, Hiccup frees Toothless from the Bewilderbeast's control, much to Drago's surprise. Hiccup and Toothless confront Drago, but the Bewilderbeast encases them in ice. However, Toothless blasts away the ice and enters a glowing super-powered state, where he is immune to the Bewilderbeast's control, enraged that the Bewilderbeast tried to hurt Hiccup. Toothless then challenges the Bewilderbeast to protect his rider, repeatedly shooting it in the face, which breaks its control over the other dragons, who side with Toothless as the new alpha. All the dragons continually fire at the Bewilderbeast until Toothless fires a final massive blast, breaking its left tusk. Defeated, the Bewilderbeast retreats with Drago on his back.

The Vikings and dragons celebrate their victory, and Hiccup is made chieftain of Berk, while all the dragons from both Berk and Valka's sanctuary bow before Toothless as their new king. Afterward, Berk undergoes repairs, with Hiccup feeling confident that its dragons can defend it.

Voice cast 

 Jay Baruchel – Hiccup Horrendous Haddock III, the son of the Viking chief Stoick the Vast and Valka, and Astrid's fianće.
 America Ferrera – Astrid Hofferson, Hiccup's fiancée.
 Gerard Butler – Stoick the Vast, chieftain of the Viking tribe of Berk, Hiccup's father and Valka's husband.
 Cate Blanchett – Valka Haddock, Stoick's wife, Hiccup's long-lost mother and a dragon rescuer.
 Craig Ferguson – Gobber the Belch, Stoick's closest friend and a seasoned warrior.
 Christopher Mintz-Plasse – Fishlegs Ingerman.
 Jonah Hill – Snotlout Jorgenson.
 T.J. Miller and Kristen Wiig – Tuffnut and Ruffnut Thorston, the fraternal twins.
 Djimon Hounsou – Drago Bludvist, a ruthless warlord and dragon hunter who seeks to take over the world with a dragon army.
 Kit Harington – Eret, son of Eret, a dragon trapper who sells captured dragons to Drago.
 Randy Thom – vocal effects for Toothless.

Production

Development 
After the success of the first film, the sequel was announced on April 27, 2010. "How to Train Your Dragon … has become DreamWorks Animation's next franchise. We plan to release the sequel theatrically in 2013," said Jeffrey Katzenberg, DreamWorks Animation's CEO. It was later revealed that DeBlois had started drafting the outline for a sequel in February 2010 at Skywalker Ranch, during the final sound mix of the first film.  The film was originally scheduled for release on June 20, 2014, but in August 2013 the release date was moved forward one week to June 13, 2014.

The film was written, directed, and executive produced by Dean DeBlois, the co-writer/co-director of the first film. Bonnie Arnold, the producer of the first film, also returned, while Chris Sanders, who co-directed and co-wrote the first film, acted only as an additional executive producer this time due to his involvement with The Croods (2013). When offered the sequel, DeBlois accepted it on condition he could turn it into a trilogy. For the sequel, he intended to revisit the films of his youth, with The Empire Strikes Back and My Neighbor Totoro having the pivotal inspirations for the film. "What I loved especially about Empire is that it expanded Star Wars in every direction: emotionally, its scope, characters, fun. It felt like an embellishment and that's the goal."

The entire original voice cast—Baruchel, Butler, Ferguson, Ferrera, Hill, Mintz-Plasse, Miller, and Wiig—returned for the sequel. On June 19, 2012, it was announced that Kit Harington, of Game of Thrones fame, was cast as one of the film's antagonists. At the 2013 San Diego Comic-Con International, it was announced that Cate Blanchett and Djimon Hounsou had joined the cast; they lent their voices to Valka and Drago Bludvist, respectively.

While the first film was set in a generic North Sea environment, the creative team decided to focus on Norway this time around. Early in the sequel's development, about a dozen of them traveled there for a week-long research trip, where they toured Oslo, Bergen, and the fjords. DeBlois, together with Gregg Taylor (DreamWorks' head of feature development) and Roger Deakins (a cinematographer who served as visual consultant), then broke off from the group to visit Svalbard and see polar bears in the wild with the assistance of armed guides.

DeBlois explained that he had learned from directing Lilo & Stitch (2002) that "if you set an animated film in a place you want to visit, there's a chance you might get to go there." He had wanted to visit Svalbard for some time, after learning of its stark beauty from a couple of backpackers he met during earlier visits to Iceland to work with post-rock band Sigur Rós on the 2007 documentary film Heima.

Animation 

Over the five years before the film's release, DreamWorks Animation had substantially overhauled its production workflow and animation software. How to Train Your Dragon 2 was the first DreamWorks Animation film that used "scalable multicore processing", developed together with Hewlett-Packard. Called by Katzenberg as "the next revolution in filmmaking", it enabled artists for the first time to work on rich, complex images in real time, instead of waiting eight hours to see the results the next day. The film was also the studio's first film to use its new animation and lighting software through the entire production. Programs named Premo and Torch allowed much more subtlety, improving facial animation and enabling "the sense of fat, jiggle, loose skin, the sensation of skin moving over muscle instead of masses moving together."

By the time production was complete, over 500 people had worked on the film at DreamWorks Animation's headquarters in Glendale, as well as its branch offices at PDI/DreamWorks in Redwood City and DreamWorks India in Bangalore.

Release 

The film was screened out of competition on May 16, 2014, at the 2014 Cannes Film Festival. In the United States, the film premiered on June 8, 2014, at the Regency Village Theater in Los Angeles, and was theatrically released on June 13, 2014. The film was also digitally remastered into IMAX 3D and released to international theaters on June 13, 2014.

Home media 
How to Train Your Dragon 2 was released digitally on October 21, 2014, and was subsequently released on DVD, 3D Blu-ray and Blu-ray on November 11. The Blu-ray and digital releases are accompanied by a new animated short film entitled Dawn of the Dragon Racers (2014), in which Hiccup and friends compete to become the first Dragon Racing Champion of Berk.

A double DVD pack with the film and Dawn of the Dragon Racers was released exclusively at Walmart stores. , 7.5 million home entertainment units have been sold worldwide.

On January 22, 2019, Universal Pictures Home Entertainment released a 4K Ultra HD Blu-ray version of How to Train Your Dragon 2 alongside its predecessor, making them the first catalog DreamWorks Animation films to be released on that format.

Reception

Critical response 
The website's critical consensus states: "Exciting, emotionally resonant, and beautifully animated, How to Train Your Dragon 2 builds on its predecessor's successes just the way a sequel should." Metacritic gives the film a score of 77 out of 100 based on reviews from 48 critics, indicating "generally favorable reviews". Audiences surveyed by CinemaScore during the opening weekend gave the film an average grade of "A" on an A+ to F scale. Audiences were a mix of 47% female and 53% male. Children and Young Adults responded most strongly, with those aged under 25 giving a grade A+.

At the 2014 Cannes Film Festival, Peter Debruge of Variety praised the film and its ambitions: "The pressures to make a giant four-quadrant monstrosity must be enormous, and yet, like his unflappable hero Hiccup, How to Train Your Dragon 2 writer-director Dean DeBlois has prevailed, serving up DreamWorks Animation's strongest sequel yet—one that breathes fresh fire into the franchise, instead of merely rehashing the original. Braver than Brave, more fun than Frozen, and more emotionally satisfying than so many of its live-action counterparts, Dragon delivers. And good thing, too, since DWA desperately needs another toon to cross the half-billion-dollar threshold." Elizabeth Weitzman of the New York Daily News gave the film three out of five stars, saying "It's the unflinching edge that gives the film its unexpected depth." Jocelyn Noveck of the Associated Press gave the film three out of four stars, saying "How to Train Your Dragon 2 doesn't play it safe, and that's why it's the rare sequel that doesn't feel somewhat stale." Lou Lumenick of the New York Post gave the film three out of four stars, saying "Dragon 2 really soars when our hero is aloft, imparting some important lessons about family, ecology and war for young audiences. It should also do very healthy business for hit-starved DreamWorks Animation." Joe McGovern of Entertainment Weekly gave the film a B, saying "The flight path needs straightening, but this is still a franchise that knows how to fly." Jody Mitori of the St. Louis Post-Dispatch gave the film three out of four stars, saying "For audiences who want a sweet story, they can't beat the first film of a boy finding his best friend. For those who are ready for the next stage, try this one about a boy becoming a man."

Bill Goodykoontz of The Arizona Republic gave the film four out of five stars, saying "It seemed as if there was nowhere new to go after the first film, but this is a richer story that dares to go darker and is thus more rewarding." Peter Travers of Rolling Stone gave the film three-and-a-half stars out of four, saying "Dragon 2, like The Empire Strikes Back, takes sequels to a new level of imagination and innovation. It truly is a high-flying, depth-charging wonder to behold." Peter Hartlaub of the San Francisco Chronicle gave the film three out of four stars, saying "DeBlois, who also wrote the script, successfully juggles the multiple story lines, shifting allegiances and uncharted lands." Rafer Guzman of Newsday gave the film three out of four stars, saying "Gruesome? A little. Scary? You bet. But that's exactly what makes the Dragon films so different, and so much better, than the average children's fare." Michael Phillips of the Chicago Tribune gave the film three-and-a-half stars out of four, saying "For once, we have an animated sequel free of the committee-job vibe so common at every animation house, no matter the track record." Stephen Holden of The New York Times gave the film a negative review, saying "The story seems to be going somewhere until it comes to a halt with the inevitable showdown between the forces of darkness and the forces of light." Peter Howell of the Toronto Star gave the film three out of four stars, saying "Taking its cues as much from Star Wars and Game of Thrones as from its own storybook narrative, How to Train Your Dragon 2 breathes fire into a franchise sequel."

Claudia Puig of USA Today gave the film three out of four stars, saying "Nearly as exuberant as the original, How to Train Your Dragon 2 nimbly avoids sequel-itis." Colin Covert of the Star Tribune gave the film four out of four stars, saying: "The impressive part is the storytelling confidence of writer/director Dean DeBlois. He has created a thoughtful tale as meaningful for grown-ups as it is pleasurable for its young primary audience." Stephanie Merry of The Washington Post gave the film three-and-a-half stars out of four, saying "This may be the first and last time anyone says this, but if How to Train Your Dragon 2 is this good, why stop at 3 and 4?" Moira MacDonald of The Seattle Times gave the film three-and-a-half stars out of four, saying: "Young and old fans of the first movie will be lining up for the wit, for the inventiveness of the characters, for the breathtaking visuals — and just the sheer fun of it all." Tirdad Derakhshani of The Philadelphia Inquirer gave the film three-and-a-half stars out of four, saying: "One of this year's true surprises, the superior animated sequel not only is infused with the same independent spirit and off-kilter aesthetic that enriched the original, it also deepens the first film's major themes." Stephen Whitty of the Newark Star-Ledger gave the film two-and-a-half stars out of four, saying: "This was not a sequel that anybody needed, outside of the accountants. And there's another already planned." John Semley of The Globe and Mail gave the film four out of four stars, saying: "More than just teaching kids what to think about the world they're coming into, it's a rare film that encourages them to think for themselves."

Rene Rodriguez of the Miami Herald gave the film three-and-a-half stars out of four, saying: "How to Train Your Dragon 2 is its own standalone picture, with a surprising range of emotions that surpasses the original and a brisk pace and manner of storytelling that give it purpose and direction. The fact that it's also so much fun, no matter what your age, almost feels like a bonus." Bill Zwecker of the Chicago Sun-Times gave the film four out of four stars, saying: "Not only does this second movie match the charm, wit, animation skill and intelligent storytelling of the original, I think it even exceeds it." Lisa Kennedy of The Denver Post gave the film a positive review, saying: "How to Train Your Dragon 2 is soaring, emotionally swooping, utterly satisfying fun." Bob Mondello of NPR gave the film an 8.5 out of 10, saying: "It's clear that [director Dean DeBlois] took inspiration from the first Star Wars trilogy—not a bad model for breathing new life, and yes, a bit of fire, into one of Hollywood's more nuanced animated franchises." Inkoo Kang of The Wrap gave the film a mixed review, saying: "If there isn't enough to feel, at least there's a lot to look at. Thanks to the superb 3-D direction by DeBlois, we swoop through the air, whoosh down dragons' tails, and  squeeze into small crevices, but still, those experiences are only like being on a really great rollercoaster—they don't mean anything." A. A. Dowd of The A.V. Club gave the film a B−, saying: "There aren't just more dragons, but more characters, more plot, more everything. The trade-off is that the charm of the original gets a little lost, a casualty of rapid-franchise expansion."

Box office 
How to Train Your Dragon 2 grossed $177 million in North America, and $441.9 million in other countries, for a worldwide total of $618.9 million. The film is the second-highest-grossing animated film of 2014, behind Big Hero 6, and the twelfth-highest-grossing film of the year in any genre. While How to Train Your Dragon 2 only earned $177 million at the US box office, compared to $217 million for its predecessor, it performed much better at the international box office, earning $438 million to How to Train Your Dragon'''s $277 million. Calculating in all expenses, Deadline Hollywood estimated that the film made a profit of $107.3 million.

In the United States and Canada, the film earned $18.5 million on its opening day, and opened at number two in its first weekend, with $49,451,322. In its second weekend, the film dropped to number three, grossing an additional $24,719,312. In its third weekend, the film stayed at number three, grossing $13,237,697. In its fourth weekend, the film dropped to number five, grossing $8,961,088.

Its $25.9 million opening weekend in China was the biggest-ever for an animated film in the country, surpassing the record previously held by Kung Fu Panda 2.

 Accolades 

 Music 

Composer John Powell, who earned his first Academy Award nomination for his music in the original movie, returned to score the sequel. Powell described the project as "a maturation story" and stated that he too tried to achieve the same maturation in the structure of his music by developing further every aspect of his compositions from the original film. Recording took place during April 2014 at Abbey Road Studios in London with a 120-piece orchestra, a 100-voice choir, and a wide array of ethnic instruments, including Celtic harp, uilleann bagpipes, tin whistle, bodhrán, and Highland bagpipes; the latter of which were performed by pipers from the Scottish group Red Hot Chilli Pipers. The ensemble was conducted by the composer's usual collaborator Gavin Greenaway.

Sigur Rós' lead vocalist, Jónsi, who wrote and performed the song "Sticks & Stones" for the first film, provided two new original songs for the sequel in collaboration with Powell: "For the Dancing and the Dreaming" (performed by Gerard Butler, Craig Ferguson and Mary Jane Wells) and "Where No One Goes" (performed by Jónsi himself). Belarusian-Norwegian artist Alexander Rybak, who voices Hiccup in the Norwegian dub of the film, also wrote and performed the song "Into a Fantasy", which is only featured in the European versions of the film.

The soundtrack album for the film was released on June 13, 2014, by Relativity Music Group. The album features over an hour of score by Powell; additional music by Anthony Willis and Paul Mounsey, as well as the two original songs written by Powell and Jónsi. Rybak's song "Into a Fantasy" was released separately as a single. A deluxe edition, consisting of previously unreleased music, was released by Varèse Sarabande in May 2022.

 Sequel 

The third and final film in the trilogy, How to Train Your Dragon: The Hidden World'', was originally scheduled for release on June 17, 2016, but in September 2014, DreamWorks Animation moved the release date to June 9, 2017. In January 2015, in the wake of the closure of Pacific Data Images and massive lay-offs, the release date was pushed back to June 29, 2018, then brought forward to May 18, 2018. On December 5, 2016, the release date was pushed back again to March 1, 2019, then on September 27, 2018, moved forward to February 22, 2019. Dean DeBlois, the co-screenwriter/co-director of the first and writer-director of the second film, along with producer Bonnie Arnold and all of the main cast (except for T.J. Miller as Tuffnut) returned,  along with composer John Powell, who scored the first two films. Cate Blanchett and Kit Harington reprised their roles as Valka and Eret, respectively, from the second film. F. Murray Abraham joined the cast as Grimmel.

Notes

References

External links 
 
 
 

2014 films
2014 3D films
2014 computer-animated films
2010s American animated films
2010s fantasy comedy films
2010s children's animated films
20th Century Fox animated films
20th Century Fox films
How to Train Your Dragon
American adventure comedy films
American children's animated adventure films
American children's animated drama films
American children's animated fantasy films
American computer-animated films
American fantasy comedy films
American action drama films
American sequel films
Animated films about dragons
Animated films based on children's books
Annie Award winners
Best Animated Feature Film Golden Globe winners
Best Animated Feature Annie Award winners
Dragons in popular culture
DreamWorks Animation animated films
Films about amputees
Films based on British novels
Films set in the Viking Age
Films set on fictional islands
IMAX films
High fantasy films
Films scored by John Powell
Films produced by Bonnie Arnold
Films directed by Dean DeBlois
Films with screenplays by Dean DeBlois
3D animated films
2014 comedy films
2014 action drama films
2010s English-language films